The municipal towns of Assam, India are included in the List of Cities and Towns in Assam. The entire work of this article is based on "Census of India", conducted by "The Office of the Registrar General and Census Commissioner, India" under Ministry of Home Affairs, Government of India. According to the data from the Census of 2011, there are 28 districts, 58 sub-divisions and 84 municipal towns in the state of Assam. There are three city in this state with a Municipal Corporation - Guwahati, Dibrugarh & Silchar.

See also
 Assam

References

External links
 Karimganj District official website
 Kamrup District official website
 Karbi Anglong District official website
 Sonitpur District official website
 Hotels in Assam by cities official website
 Tinsukia District official website
 Dima Hasao District official website
Golaghat district official website

 
Cities
Assam